David Fagen (born 1875, date of death unknown) was an African-American soldier who defected during the Philippine–American War. He acquired the rank of captain in the Philippine Revolutionary Army.

Service
A native of Tampa, Florida, Fagen served in the 24th Regiment of the U.S. Army, but on November 17, 1899, he defected to the Filipino army. He became a guerrilla leader.

His defection was likely a reaction to racist treatment of African-American soldiers within the United States armed forces at the time, as well as racist sentiments expressed towards the Filipino resistance, who were frequently referred to by American soldiers as "niggers" and "gugus".

After two other black deserters were captured and executed, President Theodore Roosevelt announced he would stop executing captured deserters.

Supposed death
As the war ended, the US gave amnesties to most of their opponents. A substantial reward was offered for Fagen, who was considered a traitor. There are two conflicting versions of his fate: one is that his was the partially decomposed head for which the reward was claimed, and the other is that he married a local woman and lived peacefully in the mountains.

Media portrayals
 Portrayed by Quester Hannah, an American theater actor, in the 2013 indie film, David F.

References

Further reading

 

People of the Philippine–American War
American military personnel of the Philippine–American War
American defectors
United States Army soldiers
Buffalo Soldiers
American rebels
American expatriates in the Philippines
Year of death unknown
1875 births